Ömer Seyfettin (11 March 1884, Gönen – 6 March 1920, Istanbul), was a Turkish writer from the late-19th to early-20th-century, considered to be one of the greatest modern Turkish authors. His work is much praised for simplifying the Turkish language from the Persian and Arabic words and phrases that were common at the time.

Biography
Ömer Seyfettin was born in Gönen, a town in Balıkesir Province, in 1884. Son of a military official, he spent his early life travelling around the coast of Marmara Sea. He also began a military career and graduated from the Military Academy (Harp Okulu) in 1903. Following he was assigned as a Lieutenant and posted to Western Border units of the Ottoman Empire Army. It was in İzmir where he became familiar with writing. In 1909, he served as an officer of the Hareket Ordusu (Action Army) which suppressed the Istanbul Irtica uprising, the religious groups opposing the newly formed constitutional monarchy in Istanbul. Mustafa Kemal Atatürk was an officer of the Hareket Ordusu. Promoted to First Lieutenant, Seyfettin was posted as an instructor in a military school in İzmir. This position was an opportunity for Seyfettin to improve his French, and interact with like-minded writers.

In 1911 Omer Seyfettin cofounded a literary and cultural magazine entitled  Genç Kalemler (Young Pens) with Ziya Gokalp and Ali Canip in Salonica. Seyfettin began the early efforts in using Turkish in his literary output as opposed to Ottoman Turkish, as he outlined to Ali Canip in a letter.  He was recalled to the army under mobilization orders at the beginning of the Balkan War and after his units were defeated in Yanina in January 1913, he spent approximately 12 months in Greece as a prisoner of war. After his release from captivity at the end of 1913, he returned to Constantinople, and was nominated the executive editor of the Türk Sözü, a publication which was related to the Committee for Union and Progress. In 1914, after leaving the army for the second time, Omer Seyfettin became a literature teacher in an Istanbul High school. He became, also in 1914, the chief-author (Bashyazar) of the magazine Türk Yurdu. Between the years 1914 and 1917 he mainly wrote turanist poems, which were published in the outlets such as Tanin, Türk Yurdu or Halka Doğru. In 1917 he was to publish most of his literary work, which included a wide array of short stories. From 1919 to 1920 he published articles in Büyük Mecmua which was a supporter of the Turkish independence war. He died of diabetes in 1920, at the age of 36.

Novels
 Ashâb-ı Kehfimiz (1918)
 Efruz Bey (1919)
 Yalnız Efe (1919)
 Yarınki Turan Devleti

Short story collections
 Harem (1918)
 Yüksek Ökçeler (1922)
 Gizli Mabed (1923)
 Beyaz Lale (1938)
 Asilzâdeler (1938)
 İlk Düşen Ak (1938)
 Mahçupluk İmtihanı (1938)
 Dalga (1943)
 Nokta (1956)
 Tarih Ezelî Bir Tekerrürdür (1958)

Poetry collections
 Ömer Seyfettin’in Şiirleri (Poems written by Ömer Seyfettin, 1972)

See also
 Turkish literature

References

 Encyclopædia Britannica Online – Biography of Omer Seyfeddin
 Biyografi.info – Biography of Ömer Seyfettin

External links
 
 Nationality and Religion: Three Observations From Ömer Seyfettin
 Ömer Seyfettin's Response to 1909 Uprising

1884 births
1920 deaths
People from Gönen
Ottoman Military Academy alumni
Ottoman Army officers
Ottoman military personnel of the Balkan Wars
20th-century writers from the Ottoman Empire
Novelists from the Ottoman Empire
Turks from the Ottoman Empire
Turkish nationalists
Burials at Zincirlikuyu Cemetery
20th-century novelists
Turkish people of Circassian descent
Turkish magazine founders